Alfred Brown (22 February 1907 – 1994) was an English professional footballer who played in the Football League for Mansfield Town, Northampton Town, Oldham Athletic.

References

1907 births
1994 deaths
English footballers
Association football wing halves
English Football League players
Oldham Athletic A.F.C. players
Northampton Town F.C. players
Mansfield Town F.C. players